Beth Axelrod is an American-born  human resources leader. She is currently Vice President of Employee Experience at Airbnb and an advisor at the Clayman Institute for Gender Research at Stanford University. Previously, She was the Senior Vice President of human resources at eBay from 2005 to 2015. Axelrod is a member of several corporate boards and academic advisory councils, including Heidrick & Struggles and the Jay H. Baker Retailing Center at the Wharton School of the University of Pennsylvania. She was formerly an advisory board member of Bulger Partners, YaleWomen, and UC Berkeley Executive Education.

Education 

Axelrod received a BSE degree from Wharton School of the University of Pennsylvania. She has a master's in public and private management (MPPM) from the Yale School of Management.

Career 
Axelrod started working at McKinsey & Company in 1989. In 2002, she was hired as the Chief Talent Officer for WPP. At WPP, she helped devise better ways to recruit and retain talented people for the company. In 2005, she was hired as the Senior Vice President of human resources at eBay. She retired from eBay in 2015 after the spin-off of PayPal and became the Vice President of Employee Experience at Airbnb in 2017.

As of 2020, Beth sits as Vice President of Employee Experience at Airbnb, a popular vacation rental home website. She heads every aspect of employee life, from hiring to office environment to fostering and keeping up the employee benefits that Airbnb provides.

Publications 
The War For Talent  is a book written in 2001 by Axelrod, Ed Michaels, and Helen Handfield-Jones. The book was based on the term 'war for talent' that was first expressed by Steven Hankin of McKinsey and Company, who was a colleague of Axelrod. The book details a study done at the company in 1997, citing the war for talent as a challenging business strategy that Hankin argued would expand over the next two decades.

Politics 
During the 2022 midterm election cycle, Axelrod donated to The Next 50, a Democratic political action committee.

References 

1964 births
Living people
Wharton School of the University of Pennsylvania alumni
Yale School of Management alumni
American women business executives
21st-century American women